Barking frog may refer to:

Craugastor augusti (barking frog or eastern barking frog), a frog in the family Craugastoridae found in Mexico and the southern United States
Limnodynastes fletcheri (barking marsh frog), a frog in the family Myobatrachidae that is native to southeastern Australia

Animal common name disambiguation pages